Monticello is a Tide Light Rail station in Norfolk, Virginia. It opened in August 2011 and is situated in downtown Norfolk on Monticello Avenue between Charlotte and Freemason Streets.

The station is adjacent to the MacArthur Center, the Norfolk Federal Courthouse, the TCC Roper Center for Performing Arts, Wells Theaters, Norfolk Scope, and the Tidewater Community College downtown campus.

References

External links 
Monticello station

Tide Light Rail stations
Railway stations in the United States opened in 2011
2011 establishments in Virginia
History of Norfolk, Virginia
Downtown Norfolk, Virginia